Nadine Gordimer (20 November 192313 July 2014) was a South African writer and political activist. She received the Nobel Prize in Literature in 1991, recognized as a writer "who through her magnificent epic writing has ... been of very great benefit to humanity".

Gordimer's writing dealt with moral and racial issues, particularly apartheid in South Africa. Under that regime, works such as Burger's Daughter and July's People were banned. She was active in the anti-apartheid movement, joining the African National Congress during the days when the organization was banned, and gave Nelson Mandela advice on his famous 1964 defence speech at the trial which led to his conviction for life. She was also active in HIV/AIDS causes.

Early life
Gordimer was born near Springs, Gauteng, an East Rand mining town outside Johannesburg. She was the second daughter of her parents. Her father, Isidore Gordimer, was a Lithuanian Jewish immigrant watchmaker from Žagarė (then Russian Empire, now Lithuania), and her mother, Hannah "Nan" (Myers) Gordimer, was from London. Her mother was from an assimilated family of Jewish origins; Gordimer was raised in a secular household.

Family background
Gordimer's early interest in racial and economic inequality in South Africa was shaped in part by her parents. Her father's experience as a refugee from Tsarist Russia helped form Gordimer's political identity, but he was neither an activist nor particularly sympathetic toward the experiences of black people under apartheid. Conversely, Gordimer saw activism by her mother, whose concern about the poverty and discrimination faced by black people in South Africa led her to found a crèche for black children. Gordimer also witnessed government repression first-hand as a teenager; the police raided her family home, confiscating letters and diaries from a servant's room.

Gordimer was educated at a Catholic convent school, but was largely home-bound as a child because her mother, for "strange reasons of her own", did not put her into school (apparently, she feared that Gordimer had a weak heart). Home-bound and often isolated, she began writing at an early age, and published her first stories in 1937 at the age of 15. Her first published work was a short story for children, "The Quest for Seen Gold", which appeared in the Children's Sunday Express in 1937; "Come Again Tomorrow", another children's story, appeared in Forum around the same time. At the age of 16, she had her first adult fiction published.

Career
Gordimer studied for a year at the University of the Witwatersrand, where she mixed for the first time with fellow professionals across the colour bar. She also became involved in the Sophiatown renaissance. She did not complete her degree, but moved to Johannesburg in 1948, where she lived thereafter. While taking classes in Johannesburg, she continued to write, publishing mostly in local South African magazines. She collected many of these early stories in Face to Face, published in 1949.

In 1951, the New Yorker accepted Gordimer's story "A Watcher of the Dead", beginning a long relationship, and bringing Gordimer's work to a much larger public. Gordimer, who said she believed the short story was the literary form for our age, continued to publish short stories in the New Yorker and other prominent literary journals. Her first publisher, Lulu Friedman, was the wife of the Parliamentarian Bernard Friedman, and it was at their house, "Tall Trees" in First Avenue, Lower Houghton, Johannesburg, that Gordimer met other anti-apartheid writers.

Gordimer's first novel, The Lying Days, was published in 1953.

Activism and professional life
The arrest of her best friend, Bettie du Toit, in 1960 and the Sharpeville massacre spurred Gordimer's entry into the anti-apartheid movement. Thereafter, she quickly became active in South African politics, and was close friends with Nelson Mandela's defence attorneys (Bram Fischer and George Bizos) during his 1962 trial. She also helped Mandela edit his famous speech "I Am Prepared to Die", given from the defendant's dock at the trial. When Mandela was released from prison in 1990, she was one of the first people he wanted to see.

During the 1960s and 1970s, she continued to live in Johannesburg, although she occasionally left for short periods of time to teach at several universities in the United States. She had begun to achieve international literary recognition, receiving her first major literary award, the W. H. Smith Commonwealth Literary Award, in 1961. Throughout this time, Gordimer continued to demand through both her writing and her activism that South Africa re-examine and replace its long-held policy of apartheid.

During this time, the South African government banned several of her works, two for lengthy periods of time. The Late Bourgeois World was Gordimer's first personal experience with censorship; it was banned in 1976 for a decade by the South African government. A World of Strangers was banned for twelve years. Other works were censored for lesser amounts of time. Burger's Daughter, published in June 1979, was banned one month later. The Publications Committee's Appeal Board reversed the censorship of Burger's Daughter three months later, determining that the book was too one-sided to be subversive. Gordimer responded to this decision in Essential Gesture (1988), pointing out that the board banned two books by black authors at the same time it unbanned her own work. July's People was also banned under apartheid, and faced censorship under the post-apartheid government as well. In 2001, a provincial education department temporarily removed July's People from the school reading list, along with works by other anti-apartheid writers, describing July's People as "deeply racist, superior and patronizing"—a characterization that Gordimer took as a grave insult, and that many literary and political figures protested.

In South Africa, she joined the African National Congress when it was still listed as an illegal organization by the South African government. While never blindly loyal to any organization, Gordimer saw the ANC as the best hope for reversing South Africa's treatment of black citizens. Rather than simply criticizing the organization for its perceived flaws, she advocated joining it to address them. She hid ANC leaders in her own home to aid their escape from arrest by the government, and she said that the proudest day of her life was when she testified at the 1986 Delmas Treason Trial on behalf of 22 South African anti-apartheid activists. (See Simon Nkoli, Mosiuoa Lekota, etc.) Throughout these years she also regularly took part in anti-apartheid demonstrations in South Africa, and traveled internationally speaking out against South African apartheid and discrimination and political repression.

Her works began achieving literary recognition early in her career, with her first international recognition in 1961, followed by numerous literary awards throughout the ensuing decades. Literary recognition for her accomplishments culminated with the Nobel Prize for Literature on 3 October 1991, which noted that Gordimer "through her magnificent epic writing has—in the words of Alfred Nobel—been of very great benefit to humanity".

Gordimer's activism was not limited to the struggle against apartheid. She resisted censorship and state control of information, and fostered the literary arts. She refused to let her work be aired by the South African Broadcasting Corporation because it was controlled by the apartheid government. Gordimer also served on the steering committee of South Africa's Anti-Censorship Action Group. A founding member of the Congress of South African Writers, Gordimer was also active in South African letters and international literary organizations. She was Vice President of International PEN.

In the post-apartheid 1990s and 21st century, Gordimer was active in the HIV/AIDS movement, addressing a significant public health crisis in South Africa. In 2004, she organized about 20 major writers to contribute short fiction for Telling Tales, a fundraising book for South Africa's Treatment Action Campaign, which lobbies for government funding for HIV/AIDS prevention and care. On this matter, she was critical of the South African government, noting in 2004 that she approved of everything President Thabo Mbeki had done except his stance on AIDS.

In 2005, Gordimer went on lecture tours and spoke on matters of foreign policy and discrimination beyond South Africa. For instance, in 2005, when Fidel Castro fell ill, Gordimer joined six other Nobel prize winners in a public letter to the United States warning it not to seek to destabilize Cuba's communist government. Gordimer's resistance to discrimination extended to her even refusing to accept "shortlisting" in 1998 for the Orange Prize, because the award recognizes only women writers. Gordimer also taught at the Massey College of the University of Toronto as a lecturer in 2006.

Personal life
In 2006, Gordimer was attacked in her home by robbers, sparking outrage in the country. Gordimer apparently refused to move into a gated complex, against the advice of some friends.

In a 1979–80 interview Gordimer identified herself as an atheist, but added: "I think I have a basically religious temperament, perhaps even a profoundly religious one."

Gordimer had a daughter, Oriane (born 1950), by her first marriage in 1949 to Gerald Gavron, a local dentist, from whom she was divorced within three years.  In 1954, she married Reinhold Cassirer, a highly respected art dealer who established the South African Sotheby's and later ran his own gallery; their "wonderful marriage" lasted until his death from emphysema in 2001. Their son, Hugo, was born in 1955, and is a filmmaker in New York, with whom Gordimer collaborated on at least two documentaries.

Unauthorised biography
Ronald Suresh Roberts published a biography of Gordimer, No Cold Kitchen, in 2006. She had granted Roberts interviews and access to her personal papers, with an understanding that she would authorise the biography in return for a right to review the manuscript before publication. However, Gordimer and Roberts failed to reach an agreement over his account of the illness and death of Gordimer's husband Reinhold Cassirer and an affair Gordimer had in the 1950s, as well as criticism of her views on the Israel–Palestine conflict. Roberts published independently, not as "authorised", and Gordimer disowned the book, accusing Roberts of breach of trust.

In addition to those disagreements, Roberts criticises Gordimer's post-apartheid advocacy on behalf of black South Africans, in particular her opposition to the government's handling of the AIDS crisis, as a paternalistic and hypocritical white liberalism. The biography also stated that Gordimer's 1954 New Yorker essay, "A South African Childhood", was not wholly biographical and contained some fabricated events.

Death
Gordimer died in her sleep on 13 July 2014 at the age of 90.

Works, themes, and reception
Gordimer achieved lasting international recognition for her works, most of which deal with political issues, as well as the "moral and psychological tensions of her racially divided home country." Virtually all of Gordimer's works deal with themes of love and politics, particularly concerning race in South Africa. Always questioning power relations and truth, Gordimer tells stories of ordinary people, revealing moral ambiguities and choices. Her characterization is nuanced, revealed more through the choices her characters make than through their claimed identities and beliefs. She also weaves in subtle details within the characters' names.

Overview of critical works
Her first published novel, The Lying Days (1953), takes place in Gordimer's home town of Springs, Transvaal, an East Rand mining town near Johannesburg. Arguably a semi-autobiographical work, The Lying Days is a Bildungsroman, charting the growing political awareness of a young white woman, Helen, toward small-town life and South African racial division.

In her 1963 work, Occasion for Loving, Gordimer puts apartheid and love squarely together. Her protagonist, Ann Davis, is married to Boaz Davis, an ethnomusicologist, but in love with Gideon Shibalo, an artist with several failed relationships. Davis is white, however, and Shibalo is black, and South Africa's government criminalised such relationships.

Gordimer collected the James Tait Black Memorial Prize for A Guest of Honour in 1971 and, in common with a number of winners of this award, she was to go on to win the Booker Prize. The Booker was awarded to Gordimer for her 1974 novel, The Conservationist, and was a co-winner with Stanley Middleton's novel Holiday. The Conservationist explores Zulu culture and the world of a wealthy white industrialist through the eyes of Mehring, the antihero. Per Wästberg described The Conservationist as Gordimer's "densest and most poetical novel". Thematically covering the same ground as Olive Schreiner's The Story of an African Farm (1883) and J. M. Coetzee's In the Heart of the Country (1977), the "conservationist" seeks to conserve nature to preserve the apartheid system, keeping change at bay. When an unidentified corpse is found on his farm, Mehring does the "right thing" by providing it a proper burial; but the dead person haunts the work, a reminder of the bodies on which Mehring's vision would be built.

Gordimer's 1979 novel Burger's Daughter is the story of a woman analysing her relationship with her father, a martyr to the anti-apartheid movement. The child of two Communist and anti-apartheid revolutionaries, Rosa Burger finds herself drawn into political activism as well. Written in the aftermath of the 1976 Soweto uprising, the novel was shortly thereafter banned by the South African government. Gordimer described the novel as a "coded homage" to Bram Fischer, the lawyer who defended Nelson Mandela and other anti-apartheid activists.

In July's People (1981), she imagines a bloody South African revolution, in which white people are hunted and murdered after blacks revolt against the apartheid government. The work follows Maureen and Bamford Smales, an educated white couple, hiding for their lives with July, their long-time former servant. The novel plays off the various groups of "July's people": his family and his village, as well as the Smales. The story examines how people cope with the terrible choices forced on them by violence, race hatred, and the state.

The House Gun (1998) was Gordimer's second post-apartheid novel. It follows the story of a couple, Claudia and Harald Lingard, dealing with their son Duncan's murder of one of his housemates. The novel treats the rising crime rate in South Africa and the guns that virtually all households have, as well as the legacy of South African apartheid and the couple's concerns about their son's lawyer, who is black. The novel was optioned for film rights to Granada Productions.

Gordimer's award-winning 2002 novel, The Pickup, considers the issues of displacement, alienation, and immigration; class and economic power; religious faith; and the ability for people to see, and love, across these divides. It tells the story of a couple: Julie Summers, a white woman from a financially secure family, and Abdu, an illegal Arab immigrant in South Africa. After Abdu's visa is refused, the couple returns to his homeland, where she is the alien. Her experiences and growth as an alien in another culture form the heart of the work.

Get a Life, written in 2005 after the death of her long-time spouse, Reinhold Cassirer, is the story of a man undergoing treatment for a life-threatening disease. While clearly drawn from personal life experiences, the novel also continues Gordimer's exploration of political themes. The protagonist is an ecologist, battling installation of a planned nuclear plant. But he is at the same time undergoing radiation therapy for his cancer, causing him personal grief and, ironically, rendering him a nuclear health hazard in his own home. Here, Gordimer again pursues the questions of how to integrate everyday life and political activism. New York Times critic J. R. Ramakrishnan, who noted a similarity with author Mia Alvar, wrote that Gordimer wrote about "long-suffering spouses and (the) familial enablers of political men" in her fiction.

Honours and awards
 W. H. Smith Commonwealth Literary Award for Friday's Footprint (1961)
 James Tait Black Memorial Prize for A Guest of Honour (1972)
 Booker Prize for The Conservationist (1974)
 Central News Agency Literary Award for The Conservationist (1974)
 Grand Aigle d'Or (France) (1975)
 Orange Prize shortlist; she declined
 Central News Agency Literary Award for Burger's Daughter (1979)
 Central News Agency Literary Award for July's People (1981)
 Scottish Arts Council Neil M. Gunn Fellowship (1981)
 Modern Language Association Honorary Fellow (1984)
 Rome Prize (1984)
 Premio Malaparte (Italy) (1985)
 Nelly Sachs Prize (Germany) (1985)
 Bennett Award (United States) (1987)
 Anisfield-Wolf Book Award for A Sport of Nature (1988)
 Inducted as an honorary member into Phi Beta Kappa (1988)
 Central News Agency Literary Award for My Son's Story (1990)
 Nobel Prize for Literature (1991)
 International Botev Prize Laureate (1996)
 Commonwealth Writers' Prize for the Best Book from Africa for The Pickup (2002)
 Booker Prize longlist for The Pickup (2001)
 Officier of the Legion of Honour (2007)
American Philosophical Society, Member (2008)
 American Academy of Arts and Letters, Honorary Member (1979)
 American Academy of Arts and Sciences, Honorary Member (1980)
 Royal Society of Literature, Fellow
 Congress of South African Writers, Patron
 Ordre des Arts et des Lettres, Commander
 15 honorary degrees
 Senior Fellow, Massey College of the University of Toronto
 Golden Plate Award of the American Academy of Achievement presented by Awards Council member Archbishop Desmond Tutu at an awards ceremony at St. George’s Cathedral in Cape Town, South Africa (2009)
 Order of the Aztec Eagle

Tribute
On 20 November 2015, Google celebrated her 92nd birthday with a Google Doodle.

Bibliography

Novels
 The Lying Days (1953)
 A World of Strangers (1958)
 Occasion for Loving (1963)
 The Late Bourgeois World (1966)
 A Guest of Honour (1970)
 The Conservationist (1974) – joint winner of the Booker prize in 1974
 Burger's Daughter (1979)
 July's People (1981)
 A Sport of Nature (1987)
 My Son's Story (1990)
 None to Accompany Me (1994)
 The House Gun (1998)
 The Pickup (2001)
 Get a Life (2005)
 No Time Like the Present (2012)

Plays
 The First Circle, in Six One-act Plays by South African Authors (1949)

Short fiction

Collections
 Face to Face (1949)
 The Soft Voice of the Serpent (1952)
 Six Feet of the Country (1956)
 Which New Era Would That Be? (1956)
 Friday's Footprint (1960)
 Not for Publication (1965)
 Livingstone's Companions (1970)
 Selected Stories (1975)
Some Monday for Sure (1976)
 No Place Like: Selected Stories (1978)
 A Soldier's Embrace (1980)
 Town and Country Lovers (1982), published by Sylvester & Orphanos
 Something Out There (1984)
 Correspondence Course and other Stories (1984)
 The Moment Before the Gun Went Off (1988)
 Once Upon a Time (1989)
 Crimes of Conscience (1991)
 Jump: And Other Stories (1991)
 Why Haven't You Written: Selected Stories 1950-1972 (1992)
 Something for the Time Being 1950-1972 (1992)
 Loot and Other Stories (2003)
 Beethoven Was One-Sixteenth Black (2007)
 A Beneficiary (2007)
 Life Times: Stories (2011)

Essays, reporting and other contributions
 What Happened to Burger's Daughter or How South African Censorship Works (1980)
 The Essential Gesture: Writing, Politics and Places (1988)
 The Black Interpreters (1973)
 Writing and Being: The Charles Eliot Norton Lectures (1995)
 Living in Hope and History (1999)

Edited works
 Telling Tales (2004)
 Telling Times: Writing and Living, 1950–2008 (2010)

Other
 "The Gordimer Stories" (1981–82) – adaptations of seven short stories; she wrote screenplays for four of them
 On the Mines (1973)
 Lifetimes Under Apartheid (1986)
 "Choosing for Justice: Allan Boesak" (1983) (documentary with Hugo Cassirer)
 "Berlin and Johannesburg: The Wall and the Colour Bar" (documentary with Hugo Cassirer)

Source:

Reviews
Girdwood, Alison (1984), Gordimer's South Africa, a review of Something Out There, in Parker, Geoff (ed.), Cencrastus No. 18, Autumn 1984, p. 50,

See also
 List of female Nobel laureates
 List of Jewish Nobel laureates

References

Further reading

Brief biographies
 
 LitWeb.net: Nadine Gordimer Biography (2003)
 Guardian Books "Author Page", with profile and links to further articles

Obituaries
The Guardian
The Independent
The New York Times
The Washington Post
The Wall Street Journal

Critical studies
 Stephen Clingman, The Novels of Nadine Gordimer: History from the Inside (1986)
 John Cooke, The Novels of Nadine Gordimer
 Andrew Vogel Ettin, Betrayals of the Body Politic: The Literary Commitments of Nadine Gordimer (1993)
 Dominic Head, Nadine Gordimer (1994)
 Christopher Heywood, Nadine Gordimer (1983)
 Santayana, Vivek. 2021. Most difficult and least glamorous : the politics of style in the late works of Nadine Gordimer. University of Edinburgh: Doctoral dissertation.
 Rowland Smith, editor, Critical Essays on Nadine Gordimer (1990)
 Barbara Temple-Thurston, Nadine Gordimer Revisited (1999) 
 Kathrin Wagner, Rereading Nadine Gordimer (1994)
 Louise Yelin, From the Margins of Empire: Christina Stead, Doris Lessing, Nadine Gordimer (1998)
 Nadine Gordimer's Politics Article by Jillian Becker in Commentary, February 1992

Articles
Ian Fullerton, Politics and the South African Novel in English, in Bold, Christine (ed.) Cencrastus No. 3, Summer 1980, pp. 22 & 23

Short reviews
 Index of New York Times articles on Gordimer

Speeches and interviews
 Ian Fullerton & Glen Murray, An Interview with Nadine Gordimer, in Murray, Glen (ed.), Cencrastus No. 6, Autumn 1981, pp. 2 – 5
 
 Nadine Gordimer, Nancy Topping Bazin, and Marilyn Dallman Seymour, Conversations with Nadine Gordimer (1990)
  with the Nobel Lecture, 7 December 1991 Writing and Being 
 Nadine Gordimer: The Ultimate Safari reading from 2007 PEN World Voices Festival
 A Conversation with Nadine Gordimer at The Arthur Miller Freedom to Write Lecture, 2007 from PEN American Center

Biographies
 Ronald Suresh Roberts, No Cold Kitchen: A Biography of Nadine Gordimer (2005)

Research archives
 Collection Index for Nadine Gordimer Short Stories and Novel Manuscript collection, 1958–1965 (Harry Ransom Humanities Research Center, University of Texas, Austin, Texas)
 Guide to the Gordimer manuscripts, 1934–1991 (Lilly Library, Indiana University, Bloomington, Indiana)
 Nadine Gordimer Collection at the Harry Ransom Center at the University of Texas at Austin

External links

Short Stories by Nadine Gordimer on the Web

 
1923 births
2014 deaths
Nobel laureates in Literature
South African Nobel laureates
Women Nobel laureates
Booker Prize winners
Fellows of the Royal Society of Literature
James Tait Black Memorial Prize recipients
Jewish activists
Jewish South African anti-apartheid activists
Jewish atheists
Jewish women writers
Recipients of the Legion of Honour
People from Springs, Gauteng
South African atheists
South African dramatists and playwrights
South African Jews
South African people of British-Jewish descent
South African people of Lithuanian-Jewish descent
South African women novelists
South African women short story writers
South African short story writers
20th-century South African novelists
20th-century South African women writers
21st-century South African novelists
21st-century South African women writers
Women dramatists and playwrights
White South African anti-apartheid activists
20th-century dramatists and playwrights
20th-century short story writers
21st-century short story writers
Columbia University faculty
The New Yorker people
Academic staff of the University of Toronto